SuperTed is a Welsh superhero animated television series about an anthropomorphic teddy bear with superpowers, created by writer and animator Mike Young. Originally created by Young as a series of stories to help his son overcome his fear of the dark, SuperTed became a popular series of books and led to an animated series produced from 1982 to 1986. An American-produced series, The Further Adventures of SuperTed, was produced by Hanna Barbera in 1989. The series also aired on The Disney Channel in the United States where it became the first British animated series to air on that channel.

Creation
The character was created by Mike Young in 1978 for his son to help him overcome his fear of darkness. Later Young decided to put the stories into book form, originally as a bear from the woods who was also afraid of the dark, until one day Mother Nature gave him a magic word which gives him superpowers and transforms him into SuperTed. 
His early attempts were unsuccessful, until he made some adjustments with the help of a local printer and was finally able to get his stories published. This led Young to write and publish over 100 SuperTed books, with illustrations done by Philip Watkins, until 1990. Just after his first book was published, his wife suggested he should produce a stuffed toy version of SuperTed, which was done in 1980.

Young was determined to keep SuperTed Welsh, as he wanted to help create local jobs and prove that places outside London had talent. In 1982, S4C enquired about making SuperTed into animations, but Young decided to create Siriol Productions to produce the series himself. Siriol management wished to create SuperTed in a way which their own children could be proud of, free from facile plots and hard-line violence. This concept continued to be adopted in all series made by Siriol, which proves that "soft edge and quality animation can be more appealing to children than any amount of violence". By November 1982 it had been sold to over 30 countries.

In 1989 Mike Young partly sold off the rights to the series, with a 75% stake in SuperTed being acquired by the newly formed Abbey Home Entertainment with Young retaining the other 25%. The ownership nowadays is through AHE's successor company Abbey Home Media alongside Mike Young.

Premise
The story follows an ordinary teddy bear who, upon his creation at a toy factory, was deemed defective and thrown away into a storeroom. By chance, he is discovered by Spotty, a visiting alien from the Planet Spot, who decides to bring the bear to life using his cosmic dust. Spotty then brings the now living teddy bear to Mother Nature, who gives the bear special powers, transforming him into SuperTed. Whenever trouble arises, SuperTed whispers his "secret magic word" and transforms into a superhero adorned with a red suit, cape and rocket boots. As SuperTed and Spotty travel across the world, and sometimes even space, to help others in need, they find themselves up against the nefarious and greedy cowboy, Texas Pete, and his two henchmen; the overweight and bumbling Bulk and the cowardly and effeminate Skeleton, as he seeks to either rule the world or increase his own wealth.

The Further Adventures of SuperTed

The Further Adventures of SuperTed is an American-produced series, produced by Hanna-Barbera and broadcast in 1989. The revival was one of four series aired as part of The Funtastic World of Hanna-Barbera syndicated animation block.

Public Service Film
SuperTed, along with Spotty and his sister Blotch, appeared in a Public Information Film sponsored by the Green Cross Code in 1986. The film, commissioned by the Central Office of Information, was entitled "Super Safe with SuperTed", and featured the three characters being flown to Earth by SuperTed, in order to teach Spotty how to cross the road safely after he nearly gets killed by recklessly rushing across the road on the planet Spot (his home), to talk to his sister. It was included in two episode compilation videos: Magic of SuperTed (1986) and The Biggest Ever SuperTed Video (1994).

SuperTed proceeds during the animation to teach Spotty the right way to cross the road, including not running, not standing behind vehicles, etc. He then warns the viewer: "Remember, I can't be there to save you, especially on the planet Earth". The animated "setting" for the film was based on Castle Street in Cardiff city centre, Wales with Cardiff Castle as a backdrop.

This SuperTed public information film was first broadcast on BBC on 26 March 1986 and was later rebroadcast and edited as a short commercial.

Stage show
SuperTed  was also turned into a stage show. Melvyn Hayes reprised his role but other parts were taken by other actors. SuperTed popularity even led to the production of a line of vitamin supplements for children.

International broadcast
SuperTed aired in Australia on ABC (where it was shown many times twice, starting from 3 May 1986 on Saturday mornings and then on weekday afternoons on 27 April 1987 and continued airing along with its American sequel until 13 May 1997), NTA in Nigeria, Channel 5 in Singapore (where it was reedited into two episodes), ZBC in Zimbabwe, Kabel 1 in Germany, Rai 3 in Italy, SVT in Sweden, The Disney Channel and now Kabillion in the United States, NRK in Norway, TF1 and Canal J in France, RTÉ1, RTÉ2 and TG4 in Ireland (where it was dubbed into the Irish language), TV One and TV2 in New Zealand, Dubai 33 in the United Arab Emirates, Kolmoskanava and MTV3 in Finland, Sjónvarpið in Iceland and many other countries around the world.

Planned relaunch
In July 2014, SuperTed co-creator Mike Young announced that he was developing a brand new series of SuperTed with Abbey Home Media. The series, which will consist of 26 half-hour episodes, was pitched at trade shows in Autumn 2014, with the hope of a television broadcast in the United Kingdom in 2016. In an interview with Radio Times magazine, Young mentioned that certain aspects of the series would have to be changed for modern audiences. He stated, "In SuperTed, we had a gun-slinging cowboy, a flamboyantly gay skeleton and a fat guy who had jokes made about his weight. And all these things you just wouldn't do today. But you can still write the show in a funny, entertaining way." He also added that he wants to avoid making the reboot look too slick and lose some of its original charm like some other rebooted franchises, with hopes Derek Griffiths will return as the voice of SuperTed. In February 2016 Mike Young announced SuperTed would return towards the end of 2016, but admitted "SuperTed and his rivals Texas Pete, Bulk and Skeleton may have to change their ways to fit in with the expectations of a modern audience."

In March 2021, it was announced work had begun on new episodes, with a view to relaunch the show by 2023

Characters

Heroes
SuperTed - A teddy bear brought to life by Spotty's cosmic dust and given special powers by Mother Nature. By uttering his secret magic word he can don his superhero outfit, complete with rocket boots, which he uses to fight evil around the world. He is voiced by Geraint Jarman in the original Welsh-language version of the show and Derek Griffiths in the English dub.
Spotty - SuperTed's bumbling companion and best friend, a yellow and green spotted alien from the planet Spot. He brought SuperTed to life with his cosmic dust and accompanies him on his missions, regardless of whether he wants to or not. He wears a jetpack for moving about and pilots a large spotted rocket to travel over the world or across space. He is voiced by Martin Griffiths in the original Welsh-language version of the show and Jon Pertwee in the English dub.
Blotch - Spotty's sister, who is voiced by Sheila Steafel in the original Welsh-language version of the show and Wendy Padbury voiced Blotch in Super Safe with SuperTed.
Mother Nature - Mother Nature, voiced by Valmai Jones in the original Welsh-language version of the show and Sheila Steafel in the English version, is portrayed here as a fairy who grants SuperTed his super powers with a special potion.

Villains
Texas Pete - The main villain of the series.  Texas Pete is an evil cowboy who serves as SuperTed's arch-adversay. His goals are generally simple-minded, be it world domination, the destruction of SuperTed, or simply increasing his own wealth. He is voiced by Gari Williams in the original Welsh-language version of the show and Victor Spinetti in the English-language version.
Skeleton - A very cowardly, noticeably-effeminate and exceptionally camp living skeleton who wears blue gloves and pink slippers. He is capable of being put back together whenever he falls to bits. He is voiced by Emyr Young in the Welsh-language version and Melvyn Hayes in the English dub. According to Mike Young, Skeleton is gay.
Bulk – An overweight and immensely stupid fool who serves as the muscle of the group. He is voiced by Huw Ceredig in the Welsh language original and Roy Kinnear in the English dub.

Other
Narrator - voiced by Dyfan Roberts in Welsh and Peter Hawkins in English.

Episodes
As Young was determined to keep SuperTed Welsh, he entered into partnership with S4C (the newly formed Welsh television channel) in 1981 who approached him about producing an animated series of SuperTed.  He set up Siriol Animation with his wife, to produce the series locally, which first aired on 1 November 1982 on S4C in Welsh. The following year, it was dubbed into English and broadcast all over the United Kingdom on BBC1, from 4 October 1983.

Unlike the books, the television series was written by Robin Lyons and director Dave Edwards, who were also Directors of Siriol Animation, and between 1983 and 1986, three series, consisting of 12 episodes each, were made:

Series 1 (1983)

Series 2 (1984)

Series 3 (1985/1986)

References

External links
 Toonhound – SuperTed
 

1980s British animated television series
1980s British children's television series
1983 British television series debuts
1986 British television series endings
British children's animated adventure television series
British children's animated comedy television series
British children's animated superhero television series
BAFTA winners (television series)
BBC children's television shows
Animated television series about bears
S4C original programming
Parody superheroes
Sentient toys in fiction
Teddy bears
Television characters introduced in 1983